Bessler is a surname. Notable people with the surname include:

Johann Bessler (1680–1745), German entrepreneur 
Albert Bessler (1905–1975), German film actor
John Bessler (born 1967), American attorney and academic
Phil Bessler (1913–1995), professional hockey player
Bernardo Bessler, Brazilian violinist, conductor, teacher and producer

See also
Besler (disambiguation)
Beseler